Halroy Candis Williams (born December 14, 1938) is an American actor, best known for his recurring roles as Police Officer Smith ("Smitty") on Sanford and Son (1972–1976), Harley Foster on The Waltons (1973-1980), and as the patriarch Lester Jenkins, the husband of Marla Gibbs's character, on the NBC sitcom 227 which originally aired from 1985 until 1990. His film credits include Private Benjamin (1980), Guess Who (2005), and Flight (2012).

Biography
Born Halroy Candis Williams on December 14, 1938), Williams was raised in Columbus, Ohio. In the early 1960s, Williams began acting in community theater in Ohio. Williams worked as a postal worker and corrections officer before moving to Hollywood to pursue an acting career in 1968.

Williams began pursuing his acting career full-time in 1970. Since then, Willams has appeared in movies such as Paul Schrader's Hardcore, Howard Zieff's Private Benjamin (he also portrayed the role of Sgt L.C. "Ted" Ross in the television series of the same name), and Clint Eastwood's The Rookie. In the early to mid-1990s, he starred in many of comic Sinbad's productions, including The Sinbad Show and The Cherokee Kid. In one of his latest films, Williams portrayed the grandfather in the Bernie Mac film Guess Who which was released in 2005.

Personal life
Williams has been married twice and has three children. On April 11, 1975, Williams married Gay Anderson, they later divorced in November 1976.

Selected credits

Theater

Film

Television

References

External links
 
 Williams talks about his role in Bernie Mac movie "Guess Who" on movies.about.com website

1938 births
Living people
American male film actors
Male actors from Columbus, Ohio
20th-century American male actors
21st-century American male actors
African-American male actors
American male television actors
20th-century African-American people
21st-century African-American people